Cilix filipjevi is a moth in the family Drepanidae first described by Nikolai Ivanovich Kardakoff in 1928. It is found in the Russian Far East (Ussuri), Korea, north-eastern China and Japan.

Subspecies
Cilix filipjevi filipjevi (Russia: Ussuri, Korea, north-eastern China: Manchuria)
Cilix filipjevi malivora Inoue, 1958 (Japan)

References

Moths described in 1928
Drepaninae